Pelinei is a commune in Cahul District, Moldova. It is composed of two villages, Pelinei and Sătuc.

References

Communes of Cahul District